Kamalpur Halt railway station is a halt railway station on the Howrah–New Jalpaiguri line of Katihar railway division of Northeast Frontier Railway zone. It is situated at Kamalpur of Katihar district in the Indian state of Bihar. 6 passenger trains stop at Kamalpur Halt railway station.

References

Railway stations in Katihar district
Katihar railway division